The Murchison River lies within the Aoraki/Mount Cook National Park in the South Island of New Zealand.

It is fed by the Murchison Glacier and flows into Tasman Lake, thus effectively feeding the Tasman River.

Rivers of Canterbury, New Zealand
Braided rivers in New Zealand
Rivers of New Zealand